ARLENE GRASTON (born France, 1946) is an American artist and author.

Illustrated books include 
"Special Friends: Tales of Saints and Animals" 1981
"Thumbelina" 1997, text by Hans Christian Andersen Translator-Erik Christian Haugaard 
"In Every Moon There Is Face" 2003, Text by Charles Mathes (ForeWord Magazine Book of the Year)
"Do You Remember? Whispers From A Spiritual World" 2012

Original Broadway Show posters:
Bubbling Brown Sugar 1976; 
Eubie 1978

References 

New York Times review of Thumbelina

Arlene Graston books at Worldcat

The Hammersteins of New York - Catalogue for show at Lincoln Center for the Performing Arts, designed and illustrated by Arlene Graston

External links
 Artist's website 
 Fine Art Publisher info

American artists
Living people
1946 births
20th-century American women artists
21st-century American women